Boualem Boukacem, (October 12, 1957, in Beni Amrane) is a singer of Kabyle music within Algerian music.

Life
He was born on October 12, 1957, under the name Boualem Boukacem in the Azela village within the actual Boumerdès Province.

After completing his school studies, he began a teaching career in 1977 in the region of the Col des Beni Aïcha to the east of the Khachna massif in lower Kabylia.

His career as an artist in Kabyle song began in 1978 and was dedicated after the release of his first album on 1981, and he joined between his teaching profession and his vocation as an artist until 1986 when he decided to devote himself entirely to the professional song.

He is a seasoned musician who handles and uses like a virtuoso musical instruments such as the Algerian mandola, the guitar, the ney, the flute and the violin.

During the period of Salafist terrorism in Algeria, Boukacem went into exile in 1992 abroad where he remained for eight years before returning to the Algerian country during the year 2000.

In 2020, the artist Boukacem had produced in his prize list a total of more than 50 sound albums, of which 4 albums were sung by singer Ouardia Aissaoui, and 3 other albums were sung by singer Thanina Cheriet, daughter of the singer Idir.

During more than 40 years of artistic career, Boukacem had to his credit more than 120 clips produced, and animated more than 1000 galas and parties in Algeria and elsewhere, and participated in more than a hundred television programs.

During the 2010 Africa Cup of Nations, Boukacem released an album to encourage the Algeria national football team during the 2010 FIFA World Cup qualification matches at this African sporting event.

This album was released in collaboration with the national goalkeeper Lounès Gaouaoui, and included for the occasion a range of 12 songs to encourage the national green team.

Boukacem has also collaborated during his long career with several other artists in duet songs.

Discography

Adjighk Ayaguitar

Sannouva

Algerien tv

Thimahramth Ellahrir

Tharwi Thabbarwi

Sahmouth Ourar

See also
List of Algerian musicians
List of Algerians
Music of Algeria
Culture of Algeria

References

External links
 
 
 
 
 
 
 
 
 

1957 births
People from Beni Amrane
People from Thénia District
People from Boumerdès Province
20th-century Algerian poets
20th-century male writers
20th-century Algerian male singers
21st-century Algerian poets
21st-century male writers
21st-century Algerian male singers
Algerian male poets
Algerian mondol players
Algerian violinists
Male guitarists
Algerian flautists
Ney players
Berber musicians
Kabyle people
Berber Algerians
Berber activists
Berber poets
Algerian emigrants to France
Living people
20th-century flautists
21st-century flautists